Amar Wattar (born 25 January 1967) is a Syrian wrestler. He competed in the men's freestyle 68 kg at the 1988 Summer Olympics.

References

External links
 

1967 births
Living people
Syrian male sport wrestlers
Olympic wrestlers of Syria
Wrestlers at the 1988 Summer Olympics
Place of birth missing (living people)
20th-century Syrian people